My Mongolian Mother is a 2010 Chinese movie directed by Cai Ning and starring Naren Hua. Naren Hua won the Best Actress Award at the 28th Golden Rooster Awards for her performance in the movie.

Plot
The film is based on a true story and tells about two Chinese children transplanted in Mongolia, where they are adopted by Qiqigema Erji against the wishes of her husband, and raised as nomads. Once Chen Chen, one of the children, knows about his biological parents twenty years later, he leaves for Shanghai. The other child, Yu Sheng, also finally meets his biological parents, and is then faced with a choice.

Cast
 Habura
 Naren Hua
 Tumenbayaer	
 Yirgui

References

External links
 

2002 films
2000s Mandarin-language films
2002 drama films